Truth & Beauty: The Lost Pieces Volume Two (1999) is a compilation album by the American ambient musician Steve Roach. Like the first Lost Pieces, this album is a collection of pieces that were either temporally lost in Steve Roach’s archive of recording or released on limited edition, multi artist compilations.

Track listing
”Aftermath”  – 9:11
(Originally released on the Spanish edition of Stormwarning, 1992.)
”The Majestic Void”  – 5:36
(Originally released on Klem Electronische Muziek 1994, 1994.)
”Fall of Moai”  – 1:53
(Recorded in 1993, Earth Island era. Previously unreleased.)
”Earthman”  – 9:44
(With Suso Saiz. Same as track 3)
”Fate Awaits”  – 4:22
(Same as track 4)
”Beyond the Blood” – 5:15
(Recorded in 1994, Artifacts era. Additional voices added in 1998. Previously unreleased.)
”Before the Sacrifice” – 6:54
(Originally released on Twilight Earth, 1994.)
”The Unreachable Place (Again)” – 9:38
(Recorded in 1987, Dreamtime Return era. Previously unreleased.)
”The Unbroken Promise” – 7:51
(Originally released on The Promises of Silence, 1993.)
”This and the Other” – 11:15
(Originally released on Soundscape Gallery Series One, 1996.)

References

1999 compilation albums
Steve Roach (musician) compilation albums